Guido Carli (28 March 1914 – 23 April 1993) was an Italian banker, economist and politician.

His father was the prominent fascist sociologist Filippo Carli.

Biography
He was the son of Filippo Carli (1876–1938), a university professor of Sociology and Political Economy, as well as trade unionist and member of the National Fascist Party since its origins, who wrote a famous essay on the theoretical basis of the fascist state (corporate state). This fact led Guido Carli to write in some fascist magazines.

Graduated in Law from the University of Padua, he began his career in 1937 as an official at IRI.

After an experience at the International Monetary Fund, he became president of Mediocredito from 1953 to 1956; then he served as Minister of Foreign Trade in the Zoli government, from 20 May 1957 to 2 July 1958, assuming an important role of reassurance of the international markets.

From 1959 to 1960, he was president of Crediop; subsequently, in October 1959, he was appointed director general of the Bank of Italy. He became its governor in August 1960, replacing Donato Menichella, while assuming the office of president of the Italian Exchange Office. He immediately called for greater concertation between central banks and, after the fluctuating trend of the Italian lira during the decade of the economic boom, was managing the effects of currency tensions coming from the United States, which culminated in the abandonment of the gold-dollar parity and with the Smithsonian Agreement.

He remained in office until 18 August 1975, when he resigned. He was replaced by Paolo Baffi, his main collaborator — although the views were not always coincident — as general manager of the issuing institution since 1960.

From 1976 to 1980, he was president of Confindustria.

He was elected Senator as an independent among the ranks of the Christian Democracy in 1983 and in 1987; in 1992, he was not re-elected. He was president of Assonime (Association of Italian Joint Stock Companies) from 1989 to 1991. He also served as Minister of Treasure in the sixth and seventh Andreotti government, from 22 July 1989 to 24 April 1992. During his mandate he was one of the signatories of the Maastricht Treaty for Italy.

From 1 November 1978 to his death, he was president of the LUISS University of Rome, which in 1994 (one year after his death) changed its name to "LUISS Guido Carli".

Awards and honors

See also
 Libera Università Internazionale degli Studi Sociali Guido Carli

References

|-

|-

1914 births
1993 deaths
Politicians from Brescia
Christian Democracy (Italy) politicians
Government ministers of Italy
Members of the National Council (Italy)
Senators of Legislature IX of Italy
Senators of Legislature X of Italy
Businesspeople from Brescia
Italian bankers
European Union lobbyists
Presidents of Confindustria
20th-century  Italian economists
Governors of the Bank of Italy
20th-century Italian businesspeople
Grand Crosses 1st class of the Order of Merit of the Federal Republic of Germany